The Oberbergischer Kreis is a Kreis (district) in the state of North Rhine-Westphalia, Germany. Neighboring districts are Ennepe-Ruhr, Märkischer Kreis, Olpe, Altenkirchen, Rhein-Sieg, Rheinisch-Bergischer Kreis, and the urban districts Remscheid and Wuppertal.

Name
The district was named after the region known as Bergisches Land, which belonged to the County of Berg for most of the medieval era. What is called "Oberbergisch" ("upper Bergian") lies in the southeast of that earldom. By 1740, descriptions of the area distinguished between "Niederbergisch", which was north of the river Wupper, and "Oberbergisch" to its south.

In 1816, after the entire Rhineland was annexed to Prussia, the districts of Waldbröl, Homburg, Gimborn, Wipperfürth, and Lennep were created within the area now covered by the district. In 1825 the districts Gimborn and Homburg were merged into the district Gummersbach. In 1932 it was merged with the district of Waldbröl, and the region became known as Oberbergischer Kreis. The restructuring of 1969/75 created the current boundaries of the district.

Geography
The Oberbergischer Kreis covers the hills west of the Sauerland and north of the Westerwald. It constitutes the eastern part of the Bergisches Land nature reserve. Situated at an altitude of 100–520 meters above sea level, it is rich in wood and water (numbering ten artificial lakes) and thus a recreational area for citizens from Cologne, the Ruhr area and the Netherlands.

The prevailing rock is greywacke, which was and in places still is mined in large stone quarries.

Coat of arms
The coat of arms is a combination of the heraldic signs of the territories the district belonged to. The red-white bar in the top symbolizes the County of Mark and the lion that of Berg. Homburg Castle (near Nümbrecht) was the seat of the Princes of Sayn-Wittgenstein-Berleburg.

Politics

Nazi Era
Robert Ley, a Nazi politician who helped organize the recruitment of slave labor during World War II, and published an anti-Semitic newspaper, the Westdeutscher Beobachter, was born in Niederbreidenbach, a town in Oberbergischer Kreis.

District Administrator
1945-1951: Dr. August Dresbach, CDU
1951-1952: Fritz Eschmann, SPD
1952-1956: Wilhelm Henn, CDU
1956-1961: Fritz Eschmann, SPD
1961-1964: Reinhard Kaufmann, CDU
1964-1969: Dr. Heinrich Schild, CDU
1969-1989: Hans Wichelhaus, CDU
1989-1994: Hans-Leo Kausemann, CDU
1994-1999: Herbert Heidtman,  SPD

Since the October 1st, 1999 there is only one (directly elected) District Administrator who at the same time is head of management:

1999-2004: Hans-Leo Kausemann, CDU
2004-2015: Hagen Jobi, CDU
2015-today: Jochen Hagt, CDU

District Administrator for the management
1946-1979: Dr. Friedrich-Wilhelm Goldenbogen, CDU
1979-1987: Dr. Dieter Fuchs, CDU
1987-1994: Dr. Gert Ammermann, CDU
1995-1999: Heribert Rohr, SPD

Economy
The district's economy is marked by small and middle-sized industry, particularly in the areas of plastic and metal processing.

Places of interest

 The so-called "colored churches" (with medieval wall and cover paintings) are known nationally
 Stalactite cave in Wiehl
 Rhenish industry museum in Engelskirchen
 House Dahl
 Open-air museum in Lindlar
 Gimborn Castle
 Homburg Castle
 Hückeswagen Castle and the historical part of Hückeswagen
 Ehreshoven Castle
 Denklingen Castle

Towns and municipalities

References

External links

 Official website 
 tourist website 
 Kreisinformationssystem Oberberg 

 
Districts of North Rhine-Westphalia
Bergisches Land